Last Day of Work (LDW) is a video game developer specializing in casual games. The company developed real-time "Virtual Life" simulation games including Fish Tycoon, Plant Tycoon, Virtual Families and the Virtual Villagers series for platforms including PC, Mac, iPhone/iPod touch, Palm OS and Windows Mobile Pocket PC. Last Day of Work was founded by CEO Arthur Humphrey and is based in San Francisco, California.

Games
EZ Blackjack, Video Poker Teacher, Pocket Paigow (Casino Games)
Little Pocket Pet
Village Sim
 Plant Tycoon
 Fish Tycoon
Fish Tycoon 2
 Virtual Villagers: A New Home
Virtual Villagers 2: The Lost Children
Virtual Villagers 3: The Secret City
Virtual Villagers 4: The Tree of Life
Virtual Villagers 5: New Believers
Virtual Families
Virtual Families 2: Our Dream House
Virtual Families 3: Our Country Home
Virtual Town
Virtual Villagers Origins 2

References

External links 

Video game companies established in 2002
2002 establishments in California